Lepidophloeus exquisitus is a species of beetle in the family Laemophloeidae. It was discovered in 1906 by French entomologist Antoine Henri Grouvelle.

References

Beetles described in 1906
Laemophloeidae